Liar's Poker: The Great Powers, Yugoslavia and the Wars of the Future is a 1998 book by Michel Collon. It was originally written in French and was later translated to English. It speculates on the long-term goals of the United States and other great powers, and accuses the government and the media of conducting a campaign of organized disinformation.

References

Books about international relations
2004 non-fiction books